Levala may refer to several places in Estonia:
Levala, Jõgeva County, village in Estonia
Levala, Lääne-Viru County, village in Estonia
Levala, Saare County, village in Estonia